Zdeněk Jirotka (15 February 1914 – 24 May 1981) was a Czech ice hockey player. He competed in the men's tournament at the 1936 Winter Olympics.

References

External links
 

1914 births
1981 deaths
Czech ice hockey forwards
Olympic ice hockey players of Czechoslovakia
Ice hockey players at the 1936 Winter Olympics
Sportspeople from Prostějov
People from the Margraviate of Moravia
HC Sparta Praha players
Czechoslovak emigrants to the United States
Czechoslovak ice hockey forwards